Piteå Idrottsförening, commonly known as Piteå IF, is a Swedish football club located in Piteå that currently competes in Sweden's top-division women's league, Damallsvenskan.

In 2018, they won the Swedish national Championship for the first time.

History
The sports club was formed on 24 May 1918 but did not take up men's football until 1920 when they united with their local rival club IFK Piteå, which then was dissolved. The women's team was founded in 1985. Piteå IF's female section is currently playing in the highest league, Damallsvenskan, which it reached for the first time in 2009.

The club has one of the largest football youth academies in the county of Norrbotten and is one of two clubs who arrange the large international youth soccer cup, the Piteå Summer Games.

Players

Current squad
.

Former players

Stadium
The club plays their home matches at LF Arena.

Domestic

League
 Damallsvenskan (Tier 1)
 Winners (1): 2018,

References

External links
 
 Piteå Summer Games

 
IF
Women's football clubs in Sweden
Football clubs in Norrbotten County
1985 establishments in Sweden
Damallsvenskan teams
Association football clubs established in 1985